Vake is an administrative district (raioni) in Tbilisi, capital of Georgia.

Vake District Includes Neighborhoods: Vake, Bagebi, Vazha Pshavela Quarters, Nutsubidze Plateau, Tskneti

References 

Districts of Tbilisi